K.N. Joglekar (died November 1970) was an Indian politician and one of the founding members of Communist Party of India. Then he joined All India Forward Bloc. He became the General Secretary of the All India Forward Bloc from 1948 to 1952. Then he formed Forward Communist Party; in 1952 this party merged with the Communist Party of India.

In 1929, he was jailed in the Meerut Conspiracy Case.

References

Sources
Bose, K., Forward Bloc, Madras: Tamil Nadu Academy of Political Science, 1988.

1970 deaths
Year of birth missing
Indian politicians
Communist Party of India politicians from Uttar Pradesh
All India Forward Bloc politicians
Prisoners and detainees of British India